This page lists all described species of the spider family Austrochilidae accepted by the World Spider Catalog :

Austrochilus

Austrochilus Gertsch & Zapfe, 1955
 A. forsteri Grismado, Lopardo & Platnick, 2003 — Chile
 A. franckei Platnick, 1987 — Chile, Argentina
 A. manni Gertsch & Zapfe, 1955 (type) — Chile
 A. melon Platnick, 1987 — Chile
 A. newtoni Platnick, 1987 — Chile
 A. parwis Michalik & Wunderlich, 2017 — Chile
 A. schlingeri Platnick, 1987 — Chile

Hickmania

Hickmania Gertsch, 1958
 H. troglodytes (Higgins & Petterd, 1883) (type) — Australia (Tasmania)

Thaida

Thaida Karsch, 1880
 T. chepu Platnick, 1987 — Chile
 T. peculiaris Karsch, 1880 (type) — Chile, Argentina

References

Austrochilidae